Fresa may refer to:

 Fresa (slang), slang, socially used in Mexico and some parts of Latin America to describe a cultural stereotype of superficial youngsters
 Armando Fresa, (1893 - 1957), Italian politician and Civil Engineer Officer

See also 

 Fresia (disambiguation)
 Freisa